Horace John Mackennal (died 28 June 1949) was an Australian architect.

He was educated at King's School in Fitzroy and the University of Melbourne. He worked as a draftsman in the office of the Melbourne and Metropolitan Board of Works before joining the Commonwealth public service in 1902. He worked as chief draftsman in the office of the Commonwealth Works Director for Victoria before himself being made director in 1914, following some months acting in the role. He served as Commonwealth Works Director for Victoria until 1940, during which time he oversaw the development of many significant public works projects. He later worked for the Department of Munitions during World War II as munitions liaison officer.

Buildings directly attributed to Mackennal include the addition of a second floor to the old High Court of Australia building in Melbourne, the officers mess of Victoria Barracks, Melbourne, the Ingham Post Office, Canterbury Post Office, South Melbourne Post Office, Windsor Post Office and Woodend Post Office. Buildings Mackennal oversaw include the Mail Exchange Building and the Repatriation Commission Outpatient Clinic in Melbourne, the Fitzroy Drill Hall Complex, the Royal Melbourne Regiment Infantry Company Drill Hall and the officers mess at RAAF Laverton

He died in 1949 and was cremated at Springvale Crematorium.

He married Agnes E. Thomas on 16 October 1901. They had two sons.

His father John Simpson Mackennal and brother Bertram Mackennal were both influential sculptors.

References

1949 deaths
Architects from Melbourne